Justice Chaudhry Ijaz Ahmed was a former justice of the Supreme Court of Pakistan and of Lahore High Court. He died on 11th October 2015.

Early life

Mr. Justice Chaudhry Ijaz Ahmed was born on May 5, 1945 in Chak No. 15. SB, Bhalwal Tehsil, Sargodha District. He belongs to an agriculturist family.

Education and training

He graduated from Islamia College, Civil Lines, Lahore and then did his LL.B. from the University of Punjab, Lahore.

Professional career

Ijaz Ahmed entered legal profession by joining Mr. S. M. Zafar, and later established his own office under the name and style of Ijaz Law Associates. He entered as Advocate of subordinate Courts in 1973, advocate of the High Court in 1975 and advocate of Supreme Court of Pakistan in 1981.

He was Deputy Attorney General for Pakistan from August 26, 1990 till November 3, 1995.

He also served as legal adviser to:
 Board of Intermediate and Secondary Education, Lahore from 1979 till elevation to Lahore High Court
 Board of Intermediate and Secondary Education, Gujranwala from 1995 till elevation to Lahore High Court
 University of Punjab, Lahore from 1995 to April 1997
 Punjab Text Book Board Lahore and Settlement Department

Chaudhry Ijaz Ahmed was on the Panel of Advocates of:
 National Bank of Pakistan
 Pakistan Industrial Credit and Investment Corporation (PICIC)
 Water and Power Development Authority (WAPDA)

He also acted as Honorary Legal Adviser to:
 University Grants Commission
 Islamia College Old Boys Association
 Anjuman-e-Kashtkaran (working for the betterment of farmers)
 Residents Association of Lahore Cantonment Cooperative Housing Society

He served as a part-time Lecturer in the University Law College Lahore and Civil Services Academy Lahore.

He was elected as General Secretary Lahore High Court Bar Association in 1985 and was a member of Executive Committee Lahore High Court Bar Association in 1979 and 1987. He was a member of the Publication Committee High Court Bar Association Lahore and Joint Secretary Pakistan, Young Lawyers Forum in 1975. Ijaz Ahmed also acted as Secretary (Legal) Anjuman-e-Tuhaffiz-e-Haqooq-e-Insani in 1978 and was Joint Secretary of Forum Civil Liberties in 1979.

Ijaz Ahmed was Secretary General and remained Vice President of the Human Rights Society of Pakistan.

He is the author of four books:
 Separation and Independence of Judiciary
 Fikr-o Nazar
 Manual of Election Laws
 Supreme Court References

He represented Pakistan at the Second International Conference on training of the judiciary held at Ottawa, Canada, and contributed a paper on the topic “Methods of Educating newly appointed Judges” (PLD 2005 Journal Page 1).

Ijaz Ahmed was elevated as Judge of the Lahore High Court on May 28, 1997. He was elevated as Judge of the Supreme Court of Pakistan on 1 September 14, 2005 while he was acting Chief Justice of Lahore High Court, Lahore.

He retired from the Supreme Court on 4 May 2010.

He was settled in DHA Lahore.

He was married and has one son and 3 daughters.

His elder daughter Nausheen Ijaz is married to son of former Shariat court Chief Justice Zafar Yaseen.

He died on 11th October 2015 and was laid to rest on 13th October 2015.

References
4.  "https://www.dawn.com/news/1213000

1945 births
Living people
Justices of the Supreme Court of Pakistan
Judges of the Lahore High Court
Government Islamia College alumni
Punjab University Law College alumni